Los Campitos Reservoir (Embalse Los Campitos) is located in the Anchieta ravine, near Los Campitos, above Santa Cruz de Tenerife, in the Canary Islands. The dam was constructed in the 1970s, after which it was discovered that the basin could not hold water. It was subsequently waterproofed in 1978, but has never held water. It was remodeled in the early 2000s, with an enclosed tank and a new pipeline constructed. A study has been conducted to build a hydroelectric plant at the reservoir.

Construction 
The dam was constructed in the Anchieta ravine to increase the water supply to Santa Cruz de Tenerife. It was constructed by the Spanish Ministry of Public Works (Ministerio de Obras Públicas), starting in 1969, and cost 373 million pesetas.

During commissioning in 1975, it was discovered that the basin was permeable and could not hold water. After a meeting in the parliament in Madrid, an urgent repair was authorised, and the basin was waterproofed in May 1978 at a cost of 300 million pesetas. Despite this, the dam has never held water.

Remodeling 

In 2002–04 the reservoir was remodeled at a cost of €5.8 million.

Hydroelectric plant 
In 2012, a technical study was made to construct a hydroelectric plant at the reservoir, which was estimated to cost €36.6 million, and was estimated to recover its construction costs after five years of operation.

References 

Santa Cruz de Tenerife
Reservoirs in Spain